The 1996 Lafayette Leopards football team was an American football team that represented Lafayette College during the 1996 NCAA Division I-AA football season. The Leopards finished fourth in the Patriot League. 

In their 16th year under head coach Bill Russo, the Leopards compiled a 5–5 record. B.J. Gallis and Quincy Miller were the team captains.

The Leopards were outscored 214 to 192. Their 2–2 conference record placed fourth in the six-team Patriot League standings. 

Though 11 games were scheduled, only 10 were played. Lafayette's away game at Fordham on October 12 was canceled after a Fordham player collapsed and died during that day's pregame warmups. The teams were prepared to play the game November 27 if necessary to determine the league championship. Because neither team was in contention for first place at the scheduled end of the season, the makeup game was not played.

Lafayette played its home games at Fisher Field on College Hill in Easton, Pennsylvania.

Schedule

References

Lafayette
Lafayette Leopards football seasons
Lafayette Leopards football